The 1993 Copa Libertadores final stages were played from 7 April to 26 May 1993 and consisted of the round of 16 (or second stage), quarter-finals, semi-finals and the finals. A total of 16 teams competed in the final stages to decide the champions of the 1993 Copa Libertadores.

Qualified teams
The winners, runners-up and third placed teams of each of the five groups in the group stage advanced to the round of 16, alongside defending champions São Paulo, who received a direct bye to this round.

Seeding

In the final stages, the teams were seeded according to the pre-established numbering they received according to the final position they occupied in their respective group. Numbers 1, 5, 9, 13 and 17 correspond to each group winners; numbers 2, 6, 10, 14 and 18 to runners-up; and 3, 7, 11 15 and 19 to third placed teams.

Format

In the final stages, the 16 teams played a single-elimination tournament with the following rules:
 In the round of 16, quarter-finals, semi-finals and finals, each tie was played on a home-and-away two-legged basis. If tied on points after the two legs the goal difference would be applied. if still tied, extra time was not played, and a penalty shoot-out was used to determine the winners.
 In the event that the two Brazilian teams from the group stage qualify for the round of 16, the lower-seeded team between these two would face defending champion São Paulo in order to prevent three Brazilian teams from reaching the quarter-finals.
 If two teams from the same national association reached the quarter-finals, they had to face each other, and those teams that had to face them formed another tie under the same conditions.
 If one or more games are settled in the quarterfinals between clubs belonging to the same national association, the Match S1 would correspond to the pair including the lower-seeding team. The following matches would be determined according to the same criteria.
 In all cases in which the order of legs could not be determined, the lower-seeding team had to host the first leg. Defending champions São Paulo had to host the second leg in the round of 16.

The above criteria were established to ensure that the four semifinalists would be of different nationalities (Regulations Section III, Article 3).

Bracket
The original bracket for the final stages was determined as follows:

Per regulations, the original bracket had the following modifications:
 In quarter-finals, the two Brazilians teams and the two Paraguayan teams had to face each other, and the order of the ties was rearranged according to the regulations.

Round of 16
The first legs were played on 7 April. and the second legs were played on 14 April 1993.

|}

Match A

Barcelona won 4–2 on aggregate and advanced to the quarter-finals (Match S1).

Match B

Universidad Católica won 4–3 on aggregate and advanced to the quarter-finals (Match S1).

Match C

Olimpia won 5–1 on aggregate and advanced to the quarter-finals (Match S2).

Match D

Flamengo won 9–2 on aggregate and advanced to the quarter-finals (Match S2).

Match E

Cerro Porteño won 3–1 on aggregate and advanced to the quarter-finals (Match S3).

Match F

Sporting Cristal won 4–3 on aggregate and advanced to the quarter-finals (Match S3).

Match G

América de Cali won 4–3 on aggregate and advanced to the quarter-finals (Match S4).

Match H

São Paulo won 4–2 on aggregate and advanced to the quarter-finals (Match S4).

Quarter-finals
The first legs were played on 21 April. and the second legs were played on 28 April 1993.

|}

Match S1

São Paulo won 3–1 on aggregate and advanced to the semi-finals (Match F1).

Match S2

Tied 1–1 on aggregate, Cerro Porteño won on penalties and advanced to the semi-finals (Match F1).

Match S3

Universidad Católica won 4–1 on aggregate and advanced to the semi-finals (Match F2).

Match S4

América de Cali won 5–4 on aggregate and advanced to the semi-finals (Match F2).

Semi-finals
The first legs were played on 5 May. and the second legs were played on 12 May 1993.

|}

Match S1

São Paulo won 1–0 on aggregate and advanced to the finals.

Match S2

Universidad Católica won 3–2 on aggregate and advanced to the finals.

Finals

The first leg was played on 19 May, and the second leg was played on 26 May 1993.

São Paulo won 5–3 on aggregate.

References

External links
Copa Libertadores de América 1993, at RSSSF.org
Copa Libertadores de América 1993 details